Unionism in the United Kingdom, also referred to as British unionism, is a political stance favouring the continued unity of England, Scotland, Wales and Northern Ireland as one sovereign state, the United Kingdom of Great Britain and Northern Ireland. Those who support the union are referred to as "Unionists". Though not all unionists are nationalists, British unionism is associated with British nationalism, which asserts that the British are a nation and promotes the cultural unity of the Britons, which may include people of English, Scottish, Welsh, Irish, Cornish, Jersey, Manx and Guernsey descent.

Since the late 20th century, differing views on the constitutional status of the countries within the UK have become a bigger issue in Scotland, Northern Ireland, and to a lesser extent in Wales. The pro-independence Scottish National Party first became the governing party of the Scottish Parliament in 2007, and it won an outright majority of seats at the 2011 Scottish Parliament election. This led to a referendum on Scottish independence in 2014, where voters were asked: "Should Scotland be an independent country?" 44.7% of voters answered "Yes" and 55.3% answered "No", with a record voter turnout of 84.5%.

Formation of the Union

In 1542, the crowns of England and Ireland had been united through the creation of the Kingdom of Ireland under the Crown of Ireland Act 1542. Since the 12th century, the King of England had acted as Lord of Ireland, under papal overlordship. The act of 1542 created the title of "King of Ireland" for King Henry VIII of England and his successors, removing the role of the Pope as the ultimate overlord of Ireland. The crowns of England and Scotland were united in 1603, when James VI of Scotland succeeded his cousin Elizabeth I in England.

The Kingdom of Great Britain was formed on 1 May 1707 through the Acts of Union 1707, two simultaneous acts passed by the parliaments of England and Scotland. These created a political union between the Kingdom of England (consisting of England and Wales) and the Kingdom of Scotland. This event was the result of the Treaty of Union that was agreed on 22 July 1706. The Acts created a single Parliament of Great Britain at Westminster as well as a customs and monetary union. However, England and Scotland remained separate legal jurisdictions.

With the Act of Union 1800, the Kingdom of Ireland united with Great Britain into what then formed the United Kingdom of Great Britain and Ireland. The history of the Unions is reflected in various stages of the Union Jack, which forms the flag of the United Kingdom. Ireland left the United Kingdom in 1922, however the separation of Ireland which originally occurred under the Government of Ireland Act 1920 was upheld by the British Government and the Unionist-controlled devolved Parliament of Northern Ireland, and chose to remain within the state today, which is now officially termed the United Kingdom of Great Britain and Northern Ireland. The 300th anniversary of the union of Scotland and England was marked in 2007.

Support for the Union

England

In England, support for the Union has traditionally been high, while support for a separate English state has conversely been relatively low. However, the rise of English nationalism has seen a decrease in support for the United Kingdom, although English nationalism does not necessarily advocate English independence from the United Kingdom. In November 2006, an ICM poll, commissioned by the Sunday Telegraph, showed that support for full English independence had reached 48% of those questioned. However, two polls conducted in 2007 and 2013 showed that English support for the Union was stable and high, with 78% opposed to English independence in 2013.

Scotland

In 2014, a referendum for Scottish independence was held. Voters were asked: "Should Scotland be an independent country?" 44.7% of voters answered "Yes" and 55.3% answered "No", with a record voter turnout of 84.5%. Chief counting officer Mary Pitcaithly stated: "It is clear that the majority of people voting have voted No to the referendum question." Results were compiled from 32 council areas, with Glasgow backing independence—voting 53.5% "Yes" to 46.5% "No" (turnout in the area was 75%)—and Edinburgh voting against independence by 61% to 39% (turnout in the area was 84%).

Although support for independence declined and/or stagnated generally between 2015 and 2018, it started to increase towards the end of 2019. Independence was leading over Union support in most polls for each month of 2020 up to July. On 6 July 2020, Professor Sir John Curtice stated that "support for the Union [in Scotland] has never been weaker". Following the Brexit transition period, and the UK-EU trade deal going into effect, unionism has generally polled higher than nationalism within Scotland.

Wales

Northern Ireland

Towards the end of the 19th century, Irish unionism was, by and large, a reaction to an increase in movements for Irish home rule. This led to the partition of Ireland along the lines of nationalism and unionism in 1920, causing 26 out of 32 counties of Ireland to be separated from the Union to form Irish Free State in 1922. The rest of the counties were incorporated to Northern Ireland.

In Northern Ireland, support for the Union has been found to increase since the end of The Troubles, especially within the Roman Catholic population. In part, this is as a result of a decreasing association of the Union with radical or extremist political ideologies following the Good Friday Agreement.

Political parties and other groups
The following is a list of active political parties and organisations that support the Union.

Major, Great Britain-wide parties
Conservative and Unionist Party
Scottish Conservatives
Welsh Conservatives 
Northern Ireland Conservatives 
Labour Party
Scottish Labour 
Welsh Labour 
Liberal Democrats
Scottish Liberal Democrats 
Welsh Liberal Democrats
Reform UK
UK Independence Party (UKIP)
 
Northern Ireland parties
Democratic Unionist Party (DUP) 
Progressive Unionist Party (PUP) 
Traditional Unionist Voice (TUV)
Ulster Unionist Party (UUP)
The Conservatives also stand in Northern Ireland

Parties in British Overseas Territories
Gibraltar Social Democrats

Minor parties
All for Unity
Britain First
British Freedom Party (BFP) 
British National Party (BNP) 
British People's Party (BPP) 
British Union & Sovereignty Party (BUSP)
National Front (NF) 
Respect Party
Scottish Unionist Party (SUP)
More United

Militant and other groups
Ulster Defence Association (UDA)
Ulster Volunteer Force (UVF)
Orange Order

See also

Britishness

References

Further reading